ǂKá̦gára (also spelled ǂKáʻgára) is a character in ǀXam (San) mythology associated with lightning.

Mythology
A story recorded in the 19th century tells of ǂKá̦gára falling out with his brother-in-law ǃHãunu ou ǃHa͠unu. ǂKá̦gára came to fetch his sister and take her home, but ǃHãunu pursued them. ǃHãunu began to throw lightning at ǂKá̦gára, but ǂKá̦gára was unhurt and threw lightning back. ǃHãunu died slowly, thundering, while ǂKá̦gára went to sleep, also thundering.
The story is told to young children to explain lightning and thunder during a storm.

See also
469705 ǂKá̦gára, an astronomical body named after ǂKá̦gára, and its large moon ǃHãunu. (The likely pronunciations of these names are described there.)
San mythology

References

San gods
ǀXam mythology
Thunder gods